Julien Henx (born 20 June 1995) is a Luxembourgian swimmer. He competed in the men's 100 metre freestyle event at the 2017 World Aquatics Championships. In 2019, he competed in swimming at the 2019 Games of the Small States of Europe held in Budva, Montenegro.

References

External links
 

1995 births
Living people
Luxembourgian male freestyle swimmers
Place of birth missing (living people)